Karachi Race Club (KRC) is the biggest race course of Pakistan.

History
The Karachi Race Club was established in 1876.

The racing continued at the old site of behind the Karachi Cantonment railway station up to 1987. In 1989 the race Club then shifted from to the present location at Deh Safroon, Main University Road, Malir Cantonment, in Karachi. At KRC seven to ten races are held every Sunday.

Yearly races
There are only 3 races about 1800 meters to 2400 meters yearly. The Quaid-e-Azam Gold Cup distance about 2400 meters. 
 Quaid-e-Azam Gold Cup
 Karachi Derby
 New Year Cup

See also
 Lahore Race Club
 List of horse racing venues

References

External links
 Karachi Race Club - Official site
 Location Karachi Race Club - Wikimapia-->
 Location old race course - Wikimapia-->
 Karachi Race Club - Youtube Channel

Horse racing organizations
Horse racing organisations in Pakistan
Horse racing venues in Pakistan
Sports clubs in Pakistan
Sports venues in Karachi
Sports organizations established in 1876
Organisations based in Karachi
Sport in Karachi
1876 establishments in British India